Hudson Alexandre Batista da Silva (born 14 January 2001), simply known as Hudson, is a Brazilian footballer who plays as a defensive midfielder for Portuguesa.

Club career
Hudson was born in São Paulo, and began his career at Itapirense in 2016. In the following year, he moved to Juventude, but returned to his hometown in 2020 after joining Portuguesa on loan.

Initially assigned to the under-20 team, Hudson made his senior debut for Lusa on 5 June 2021, coming on as a late substitute for Ermínio in a 2–2 Série D home draw against Cianorte. In December 2021, he signed a permanent deal with Portuguesa.

On 27 June 2022, after helping Portuguesa in their promotion from the Campeonato Paulista Série A2 as champions with seven matches, Hudson renewed his contract until November 2024.

Career statistics

Honours
Portuguesa
Campeonato Paulista Série A2: 2022

References

2001 births
Living people
Footballers from São Paulo
Brazilian footballers
Association football midfielders
Campeonato Brasileiro Série D players
Associação Portuguesa de Desportos players